Stephen Morgan Fisher (born 1 January 1950) is an English keyboard player and composer, and is most known as a member of Mott the Hoople in the early 1970s. However, his career has covered a wide range of musical activities, and he is still active in the music industry. In recent years he has expanded into photography.

Career

Music
Fisher was born on 	1 January 1950 in Middlesex Hospital, London. His parents were school teachers and until 1952 lived in Robert Adam Street, London W1, then until 1958 in a council flat in Bridgeman Street, London NW8, then until 1973 in Holly Park, Finchley, London N3. From 1966 to 1970, he played the organ with the soul/pop band, The Soul Survivors, who in 1967 renamed themselves Love Affair. They had a number one hit single in 1968 with "Everlasting Love", while Fisher was taking a break from the band to complete his final year at Hendon County Grammar school. Between 1972 and 1973 he formed the progressive rock band called Morgan, with singer Tim Staffell (the lead singer of the band Smile, who later became Queen).

From 1973 to 1976, after a brief liaison with Third Ear Band, he joined British rock band Mott the Hoople. Meanwhile, Fisher contributed keyboards to John Fiddler's Medicine Head, and when Mott folded, Fisher invited Fiddler to join the remaining members of Mott in what would become British Lions. From 1977 to 1979 the Lions recorded two albums, and three singles: Kim Fowley's "International Heroes", Garland Jeffries' "Wild in the Streets", and Fiddler's own "One More Chance to Run". 

In 1978 in his home studio in Notting Hill, Fisher started an intense two-year burst of activity with four iconoclastic solo projects, all released on the new indie label Cherry Red Records. 1979's Hybrid Kids - A Collection of Classic Mutants featured art-punk arrangements of hit songs, posing as a dozen indie bands, who were in fact, all Fisher, playing keys, bass, guitar and singing. A sequel - a Christmas album called Claws came out in 1980. Fisher's first foray into ambient music came out the same year, the sublime Slow Music in which he looped and processed a performance by sax supremo Lol Coxhill. Also in 1980, Fisher conceived and produced the unique Miniatures - a sequence of fifty-one tiny masterpieces album (51 one-minute tracks by Robert Fripp, Gavin Bryars, Michael Nyman, The Pretenders, XTC, Penguin Cafe Orchestra, Robert Wyatt, Ivor Cutler, The Damned etc.) A sequel was released in 2000. Miniatures 2020 - a 40th anniversary tribute album produced by other artists - was released in 2021.

In addition he played with Queen on their 1982 tour of Europe, the first time they added an extra musician to their live shows. Freddie Mercury can be seen humorously introducing him to the audience just before the band's performance of "Crazy Little Thing Called Love", on the band's Queen on Fire - Live at the Bowl album.

Fisher shared a flat with Mott the Hoople guitarist Mick Ralphs in Rusthall Avenue in Chiswick in 1973, then in 1976 moved to Canada Road, Acton, London and in 1978 to Linden Gardens in Notting Hill. Burnt out after his two-year burst of solo recordings, he then took a three-year "sabbatical", spending time in India, Belgium, and the USA, studying meditation, vegetarianism and macrobiotics. This led to his 1984 move to Japan, where he still lives. There, he started to make ambient and improvised music, as well as becoming a successful TV commercial music composer, including songs written or arranged for Cat Power, Karin Krog, José Feliciano, Zap Mama and Swing Out Sister. Japanese artists he has worked with include Yoko Ono, Dip in the Pool, The Boom, Heat Wave, Shoukichi Kina, and Haruomi Hosono from Yellow Magic Orchestra. He also scored the Japanese anime/live-action hybrid film, Twilight of the Cockroaches (1987) and the documentary, A Zen Life: D.T. Suzuki (2006).

Starting in November 2003, Morgan performed 100 monthly solo improvisation concerts at the cutting-edge arts/music club Superdeluxe, in Roppongi, Tokyo. He called this concert series "Morgan's Organ", and has started to release live recordings of the series as downloads. The series ended in March 2013 and has been continued as "Morgan's Organ At Home" at his personal studio in Tokyo since June 2013. There he also began to host a series of "Morgan Salon" events inspired by the Salon (gathering) events in Paris in the 1920s, featuring creative individuals from other disciplines such as photography, poetry, Japanese traditional music, and sake-making.

In 2005, he collaborated with German musician Hans-Joachim Roedelius (of Cluster and Harmonia) on the ambient album Neverless (on the Klanggalerie label).

Photography
Fisher has maintained a lifelong interest in photography and in recent years has been holding an increasing number of solo exhibitions of his work in Japan and abroad. He has evolved a technique of abstract photography which he calls Light Art, influenced by the photograms of Man Ray and László Moholy-Nagy, by pendulum-created harmonographs, and in particular by the abstract cinema of Len Lye, Norman McLaren and Oskar Fischinger. Unlike most so-called "light painting," where images are created by "drawing" with flashlights, etc., in front of a camera with an open shutter, Fisher's light artworks are in the main created by moving the camera in front of various natural and man-made light sources (fireworks, sunlight on water, city illuminations, etc.). Many of his light artworks may be seen at his art website, and several were used in the booklet of his March 2009 album release Non Mon, a collection of his most well-known TV commercial compositions (Japan, DefSTAR/Sony Records).

Solo exhibitions
 1980 Institute of Contemporary Art, London
 1987 NTT (Nippon Telephone) Gallery, Tokyo
 1988 Roppongi Wave, Tokyo
 1989 Striped House Gallery, Tokyo
 2003 Uplink Gallery, Tokyo
 2007 Superdeluxe, Tokyo
 2007 Cool Train Gallery, Tokyo
 2009 Superdeluxe, Tokyo
 2010 Gallery Bauhaus, Tokyo
 2010 Blue-T Gallery, Tokyo
 2010 Gallery Cosmos, Tokyo
 2011 Winfield Gallery, Carmel CA
 2011 Fire King Cafe, Tokyo
 2011 Gallery Box, Yokohama
 2012 Foreign Correspondents' Club, Tokyo
 2013 Hard Rock Hotel, Las Vegas 
 2013 Hasselblad Gallery
 2014 Kid Ailack Art Hall, Tokyo
 2015 Fire King Cafe, Tokyo
 2019 Plate Tokyo

Discography

Solo / duo
 1973 Centuri Maya Nexus
 1979 Hybrid Kids 1
 1980 Hybrid Kids - Claws: The Christmas Album
 1980 Lol Coxhill/Morgan Fisher - Slow Music
 1983 Seasons
 1983 Morgan Fisher/John White - Play Loud / Play Quiet
 1984 Ivories
 1984 Look at Life
 1985 Inside Satie
 1985 Water Music
 1987 Flow Overflow
 1987 Life Under the Floor: Soundtrack to "Twilight of the Cockroaches"
 1988 Peace in the Heart of the City
 1989 Outer Beauty, Inner Mystery
 1990 Echoes of Lennon
 1992 Re-Lax
 1992 Re-Fresh
 1992 Re-Charge
 1994 Rebalance
 1995 Refresh (new version)
 1996 Relax (new version)
 1996 Recharge (new version)
 1998 Flower Music
 1999 Peace in the Heart of the City (new version)
 1999 Remix (remixed selections from Re series)
 2005 Roedelius & Morgan Fisher - Neverless
 2009 Non Mon 
 2011 The Great White Obi
 2014 Heartmuse

Compilations
 1980 Miniatures: A Sequence of Fifty-One Tiny Masterpieces
 1998 Echoes of a City Life (selections from Life Under the Floor, Peace in the Heart of the City and Echoes of Lennon)
 2000 Miniatures 2: A Sequence of Sixty Tiny Masterpieces

with Love Affair
 1968 The Everlasting Love Affair
 1971 New Day (credited to "LA")

with Morgan
 1972 Nova Solis
 1973 The Sleeper Wakes (a.k.a. Brown Out, unreleased until 1976)

with Mott the Hoople
 1974 The Hoople
 1974 Mott the Hoople Live

with Mott
 1975 Drive On
 1976 Shouting and Pointing

with British Lions
 1978 British Lions
 1980 Trouble with Women

with Tiswas 
 1980 Tiswas Presents the Four Bucketeers

with the Witch Trials
 1981 The Witch Trials [EP]

with Portmanteau
 2013 Portmanteau (with Tatsuji Kimura & Toshiyuki Yasuda)

with Tom Guerra
 2014 All of the Above
 2016 Trampling Out the Vintage
 2018 American Garden
 2020 Sudden Signs of Grace

References

External links
Morgan Fisher music website
Morgan Fisher art website
Morgan Fisher Soundcloud website
Morgan Fisher's blog re the Miniatures album
Hasselblad VICTOR magazine website

Superdeluxe website

1950 births
Living people
English rock pianists
English rock keyboardists
English electronic musicians
Photographers from London
English rock musicians
Ambient musicians
21st-century pianists
Mott the Hoople members
Cherry Red Records artists
British Lions (band) members